Jayaweera is a Sinhalese name that may refer to the following people:
 
Surname
Dilith Jayaweera (born 1967), Sri Lankan corporate leader
Hewage Jayaweera (born 1976), Sri Lankan cricketer
Neville Jayaweera (1930–2020)), Sri Lankan civil servant and administrator
Rajeewa Jayaweera (?–2020), Sri Lankan journalist and airline executive, nephew of Neville Jayaweera
Siripala Jayaweera, Sri Lankan provincial governor
 
Forename
Jayaweera Bandara (disambiguation)
Jayaweera Kuruppu (1908–1962), Sri Lankan politician

See also

Sinhalese masculine given names
Sinhalese surnames